The Finnish Security Intelligence Service (Supo), formerly the Finnish Security Police, is the security and intelligence agency of Finland in charge of national security, such as counter-intelligence and counter-terrorism, under the jurisdiction of the Ministry of the Interior. The agency had a distinct role during the Cold War in monitoring communists as well as in the balance between Finnish independence and Soviet appeasement. After the 1990s, Supo has focused more on countering terrorism and in the 2010s, on preventing hybrid operations.

History

During the Cold War 

The Finnish Security Intelligence Service (Supo) was established on 17 December 1948 upon ratification of the Act and the Decree on the Security Police and became operational at the start of 1949. Supo was formed to replace its predecessor, the State Police (Valtiollinen poliisi, Valpo), after communists suffered a defeat in the July 1948 parliamentary elections and the reorganization of Valpo was recommended by a governmental committee in October 1948. In essence, Valpo was abolished by the Parliament of Finland due to the fact that its leadership positions had been filled by communists who were implicated in erroneous and illegal elements according to a separate governmental committee investigation as well as linked to a number of disappearances in the aftermath of World War II.

In general, Finland is described as having been in a strategic and neutral position between the Cold War blocks; both sides engaged in intensive intelligence activities in the country. Mostly, Finland was an interest to the superpowers as a buffer zone and as an overflight and military transit route. During the first decades, the main tasks of Supo were to monitor communists, such as the Communist Party of Finland and home Russians, and prevent illegal intelligence, especially KGB and GRU espionage. The Service had to work with discretion and caution due to Finlandization—a balance between the independence of Finland and appeasement to the Soviet Union. At the same time, Supo had close connections with the CIA—although the Service was wary of recording it on paper.

When Urho Kekkonen was elected the President of Finland in 1956, Supo started to transform more into a "presidential police" that gathered information to support the President's domestic and foreign policy decision-making. The shift was partly due to the tense Finnish-Soviet relations at the time (see e.g. the night frost and note crises) as well as Kekkonen's motivation to steer the high-profile Service into alignment with his tactics in handling relations with the Soviet Union. For example, Kekkonen was kept informed of Finnish communist politicians and their internal discussions as well as was relayed information from foreign intelligence agencies, such as the British MI6. After Director Armas Alhava retired in 1972, Kekkonen appointed Arvo Pentti as the new Director—an ally and a fellow politician from the Centre Party. When Seppo Tiitinen was appointed the new Director in 1978, Kekkonen was still requesting information on political communist movements.

Kekkonen kept KGB connections close, especially its local Helsinki chief, and utilized back channels to balance between Western and Soviet interests without provocation, such as during the negotiations on Finland's membership to the European Free Trade Association in 1962. Similarly, he shifted Supo's counter-intelligence activities to quiet and preventive action. For example, espionage cases were sometimes not submitted to court and KGB diplomats were not declared persona non grata, but instead were quietly asked to leave. When KGB major Anatoliy Golitsyn defected to the United States from Helsinki in December 1961, he divulged his knowledge and opinions on KGB networks and interaction in Finland to the CIA. For example, he described President Kekkonen as being "in Soviet service" – Kekkonen was relieved when the CIA and Western intelligence took the claim with reservations. Nevertheless, the revelations prompted Western intelligence to have a more constructive and positive attitude towards Finland and the CIA shared Golitsyn's list of KGB intelligence officers to Supo for monitoring.

Systematic surveillance of communists was shut down in the early 1980s by President Mauno Koivisto. The Service did not gain powers of arrest and pre-trial investigation powers until 1 January 1989 due to its predecessors’ colourful actions and history as well as Finland's sensitive foreign policy position. Instead, the National Bureau of Investigation carried out actual criminal investigations until that point. In 1990, West German intelligence gave Supo the Tiitinen list, which supposedly contains names of Finns who were believed to have links to Stasi, the East German state security ministry. The list was classified and locked in a safe after Director Seppo Tiitinen and President Mauno Koivisto determined that it was based on vague hints instead of hard evidence. Subsequently, in 2002 the Service suspected and questioned Finnish diplomat, Alpo Rusi, of being a Stasi spy. The investigation eventually leaked to national broadcaster Yle. However, Rusi was cleared of all charges in 2007 after court proceedings and won compensation for damage to his reputation suffered when the case was leaked to the media.

After the Cold War 

The Service made a legislative initiative in 2012 to criminalize the espionage of exiles in Finland. As of April 2019, espionage of exiles was forbidden e.g. in Sweden, but not in Finland. On 1 January 2016, Supo was transferred under the direct control of the Interior Ministry from the National Police Board. Reportedly, the administrative transfer was to ensure that the Service is able to more efficiently conduct its special missions as well as to reinforce its strategic and political direction and clarify its official position both domestically and internationally. Newspapers reported in November 2016 that Supo was concerned about suspicious land and property transactions made by foreign nationals that could be utilized in hybrid operations, such as to accommodate unmarked military troops.  A new bill was in process in October 2017 to allow for security authorities to monitor purchases by entities from outside the European Union (EU) buying property near military installations or broadcast towers in Finland as well as for the State to reclaim or buy strategically important property. The Service was involved in investigating the Turku stabbing of August 2017, which is considered Finland's first suspected terrorist attack since the end of World War II.

Function and organization

Function 
The Finnish Security Intelligence Service states that its core functions are counter-intelligence, counter-terrorism and other national security-related work, such as counter-proliferation activities intended to impede the proliferation of weapons of mass destruction. It is tasked to prevent events that may cause danger to government systems, parliamentary democracy, or internal and external security of the State. Additionally, the Service is the responsible authority for national and international cooperation in the fight against terrorism, for preparing and maintaining terrorist threat assessments, for monitoring extremist phenomena, and for performing security clearances for personnel recruited into sensitive positions. Supo reports to other security authorities and the Government of Finland on its activities. According to the Police Act, Supo can utilize, among others, traffic data monitoring, covert intelligence gathering, undercover activities, pseudo purchases, and controlled delivery to fulfill its missions.

Organization 
Supo is a national police unit subordinate to the Ministry of the Interior. It follows a Nordic tradition where the intelligence agency is governed as a part of police organisations (i.e. in the form of a security police) instead of being a separate organisation. The Service formerly used the English title Finnish Security Police; the word "police" was amended in 2010 to emphasize the agency's role in security intelligence. In 2019, the Service had 440 employees, of whom 56% were police officers and 40% women, and a total budget of 50.9 million euros. In addition to its headquarters in Punavuori, Helsinki, Supo hosts eight regional offices around Finland in Turku, Tampere, Vaasa, Lappeenranta, Joensuu, Kuopio, Oulu and Rovaniemi. Supo has liaison officers posted at diplomatic missions in Nairobi, Kenya and Ankara, Turkey as well as at the European Union (EU) Intelligence and Situation Centre. The Service is divided into seven different departments as of a 2017 reorganization:

 Collection
 Counter-Intelligence
 Terrorism and Extremism
 Regions
 Vetting
 Intelligence Analysis
 Internal Services

See also 
 Cold War II
 European Centre of Excellence for Countering Hybrid Threats
 Finnish Defence Intelligence Agency
 Finnish Intelligence Division
 Law enforcement in Finland
 National Bureau of Investigation (Finland)
 Police of Finland

Notes and references

Notes 
The source Ratakatu 12: Suojelupoliisi 1949-2009 was "commissioned by Supo, but it was mainly written by professional historians". The book is considered the most definite source and the official history of Supo, but it has been criticized by diplomat Alpo Rusi and reporter Jarko Tirkkonen for not discussing certain parts of the Service's history. On the other hand, politician Erkki Tuomioja praised the book of its high quality. Tirronen and Tuomioja attribute two-thirds of the book to political history professor Kimmo Rentola—who worked for Supo as a historian while writing the book. Rentola has written that caution and source criticism are required when researching histories of security agencies due to the ambiguous and often lacking material.

References

Further reading

External links 
 Ministry of the Interior official website
 Supo official website

Law enforcement agencies of Finland
Finnish intelligence agencies
1948 establishments in Finland
Government agencies established in 1948